Rosalind C. Barnett, Ph.D. is a research psychologist, author, and public speaker. She has been invited to lecture at venues in the U.S. and abroad and has hosted the annual Ann Richards Roundtable on Gender and the Media at Brandeis University. Barnett has been identified as one of the top 25 work-family researchers in the world.

Barnett attended Queens College and received her Ph.D. in clinical psychology from Harvard University. She has held senior research positions at the Henry A. Murray Research Institute at Harvard University, the Wellesley College Centers for Women, and Brandeis University.

The National Institute of Mental Health funded her study of Family and Work Role Stress in Men, and a study of Patterns of Competence in Preschool Girls. The National Science Foundation funded a study of Women in the Middle Years and the Alfred P. Sloan Foundation has funded her research on work/family issues. Her primary areas of expertise include the work-family interface, gender similarities and differences, gender stereotypes, obstacles confronting women in the workplace, and ongoing adaptations to an aging workforce.

Barnett has published books and articles with co-author Caryl Rivers, Professor of Journalism at Boston University.

Fellowships and honors
 Phi Beta Kappa
 Woodrow Wilson Honorary Fellowship
 Recipient of the American Personnel and Guidance Association's Annual Award for Outstanding Research
 Who's Who of American Women (9th, 21st, and 22nd editions)
 2008-09 – Anne Roe Award for contributions in women's education, Harvard University, 
 1999 – Rosabeth Moss Kanter Award for Excellence in Research on Work-Family Research (2000, 2001, 2002, 2003)
 1997 – Goldsmith Research Award, Harvard University, Kennedy School of Government
 1997 – ANBAR, Citation of Excellence
 1996 – Best Paper Award: Journal of Organizational Behavior
 1988 – National Books for a Better Life Award
 1975-1976 – Radcliffe College Graduate Society Distinguished Achievement Medal

Publications

Books
Barnett, R. C. & Rivers, C. (2016). The age of longevity: Reimagining tomorrow for our new long lives, New York, Rowman & Littlefield. 

Rivers, C., & Barnett, R. C. (2013). The new soft war against Women: Why the US economy will falter if it succeeds, New York, Tarcher/Penguin. 

Rivers, C., & Barnett, R. C. (2011). Truth about girls and boys: Challenging toxic stereotypes about our children, New York, Columbia University Press. 

Barnett, R. C., & Rivers, C. (2004). Same difference: How gender myths are hurting our relationships, our children, and our jobs. New York: Basic Books. 

Barnett, R. C., & Rivers, C. (1998). She works/he works: How two-income families are happier, healthier and better off. Cambridge, MA: Harvard University Press. 

Barnett, R. C., Biener, L., & Baruch, G. K. (Eds.). (1987). Gender and stress. New York: Free Press. 

Baruch, G., Barnett, R. C., & Rivers, C. (1985). Life prints: New patterns of love and work for today's women. New York: Signet. 

Rivers, C., Barnett, R. C., & Baruch, G. K. (1979). Beyond sugar and spice. New York: G.P. Putnam's. 

Barnett, R., & Baruch, G. K (1978). The competent woman: Perspectives on socialization. New York: Irvington/Halstead. 

Tagiuri, R., Lawrence, P. R., Barnett, R. C., & Dunphy, D. (1968). Behavioral science concepts in case analysis: The relationship of ideas to management action. Boston: Division of Research, Graduate School of Business Administration, Harvard University.

Peer-reviewed articles
Barnett, R. C. (2004). Women and multiple roles: Myths and reality. Harvard Review of Psychiatry, 12(3), 158–164.
Barnett, R. C. (2004). Women and work: Where are we, where did we come from, and where are we going? Journal of Social Issues, 60(4), 667–674. (Recipient of the One of the Top Five Downloaded Articles in Blackwell Synergy in 2005 Award)
Barnett, R. C., & Brennan, R. T. (1995). The relationship between job experiences and psychological distress: A structural equation approach. Journal of Organizational Behavior, 16, 259–276.
Barnett, R. C., Brennan, R. T., Raudenbush, S. W., Pleck, J. H., & Marshall, N. L. (1995). Change in job and marital experiences and change in psychological distress: A longitudinal study of dual-earner couples. Journal of Personality and Social Psychology,69, 839–850. Listed in International Bibliography of Social Sciences: Sociology. London: Routledge, 1995.
Barnett, R. C., & Hyde, J.S. (2001). Women, men, work and family: An expansionist theory. The American Psychologist, 56(10), 781–796.
Barnett, R. C., Marshall, N. L., Raudenbush, S., & Brennan, R. (1993). Gender and the relationship between job experiences and psychological distress: A study of dual-earner couples. Journal of Personality and Social Psychology, 65(5), 794–806.
Barnett, R .C., & Brennan, R. T. (1997). Change in job conditions, change in psychological distress, and gender: A longitudinal study of dual-earner couples. Journal of Organizational Behavior, 18, 253–274. Awarded “Best Paper of 1997” by the Journal of Organizational Behavior. Also awarded “Citation of Excellence, Highest Quality Rating” by ANBAR Electronic Intelligence.
Brennan, R. T., Barnett, R. C., & Gareis, K. C. (2001). When she earns more than he does: A longitudinal study of dual-earner couples. Journal of Marriage and the Family, 63, 168–182.

References

External links
http://gendermatters.com/
http://thetruthaboutgirlsandboys.com/
https://rosalindbarnettphd.com/

Queens College, City University of New York alumni
American women psychologists
21st-century American psychologists
Harvard University alumni
Year of birth missing (living people)
Living people
21st-century American women